Prof. Yair Hirschfeld is an Israeli lecturer at the University of Haifa. Prof. Hirschfeld was a key architect of the Oslo Accords in 1993. He was born in Vienna and has been a strong supporter of the two-state solution, and has urged the Palestinian National Authority and the Israeli government to accept some form of this solution.

Israeli–PLO negotiations
In Benny Morris' account, Hanan Ashrawi and Hirschfeld began maintaining back channels to the PLO's Faisal Husseini in 1989. Hirschfeld, at Ashrawi's suggestion, sought out the PLO finance minister Abu Alaa (Ahmed Qurei). Through the Norwegians—including Norwegian Deputy Foreign Minister Jan Egeland and Rod Larsen of the Norwegian Institute of Applied Social Sciences—Hirschfeld had his first meeting with Abu Alaa in London on 4 December 1992.

On 19 January 1993 the Israeli Knesset repealed a law forbidding Israeli–PLO contacts. The next day Hirschfeld met Abu Alaa for the second time outside Oslo, accompanied by Israeli historian Ron Pundak. With the approval of Peres' deputy Yossi Beilin the three met in secret four more times. After the final meeting in May the agreement was passed to official channels, to become the "Declaration of Principles".

The first draft of the DOP laid out three basic terms: "Israel withdrawal from Gaza, gradual devolution of economic power to the Palestinians ... and ... international economic assistance to the nascent Palestinian entity in Gaza". It also included the "Gaza first" principle, according to which all stipulated Israeli concessions would be met in Gaza prior to any final settlement. By the final meeting it included elections, interim autonomy, and a handoff of power to the Palestinians, over the course of a gradual Israeli withdrawal. "Gaza first" also came to include some of the West Bank around Jericho.

Amid further indirect negotiations between the Israel and the PLO leadership in Tunis through Egyptian channels with mediation by Norway, the discussions that began between Hirschfeld and Alaa culminated in the beginnings of the Oslo peace process, when on August 20 Peres flew to Oslo—the entire process still unknown to the public—and initialed the DOP.

Scientific work 

He currently teaches at the University of Haifa in the Department of Middle Eastern History. He is the Director General of the Tel Aviv-based Economic Cooperation Foundation (ECF).

Literature 
 Track Two Diplomacy toward an Israeli-Palestinian Solution, 1978–2014, Woodrow Wilson Center Press and Johns Hopkins University Press 2014.

References

External links
 The Wilson Center – Yair Hirschfeld, PhD
 Galilee International Management Institute – Dr. Yair Hirschfeld
 Peace is only a question of time
The Road to Oslo, Secret Negotiations between Israel and the PLO, 1993, a publication on the website of the Israel State Archives, based on Yair Hirschfeld's papers *

Living people
Academic staff of the University of Haifa
Year of birth missing (living people)